János Hill (also John's Hill) is the highest point of Budapest with a height of , located in the western part of the city. From Elizabeth Lookout on the top of the hill one can get an impressive panoramic view of the whole region.

Background
János-hegy belongs to Buda Hills and it is connected to the popular tourist sight Normafa. Between the two hills spread the long and narrow Normafa Plateau (Normafa fennsík). The hill is made up of Dachstein Formation.

In the János-hegy area you will find the 

In the saddle between Hárshegy and János-hegy is Szépjuhászné the site of the Pauline Monastery where the Pauline Order founded their first friary.

Gallery

References

External links 
 
 
 
 
 

Hegyvidék
Buda Hills